Miracle of Science may refer to:

 A Miracle of Science, a science fiction webcomic
 Miracle of Science (album), an album by Marshall Crenshaw